The 2013–14 Liga Bet season saw Ihud Bnei Majd al-Krum (champions of the North A division), Ironi Nesher (champions of the North B division), Hapoel Morasha Ramat HaSharon (champions of the South A division) and F.C. Shikun HaMizrach (champions of the South B division) win the title and promotion to Liga Alef.

The clubs ranked 2nd to 5th in each division entered a promotion play-off, at the end of which, in the North section Maccabi Sektzia Ma'alot-Tarshiha and Hapoel Hod HaSharon won against their Liga Alef opponents and were promoted to Liga Alef as well.

At the bottom, F.C. Bnei Arraba (from North A division), F.C. Bu'eine (from North B division), Shimshon Bnei Tayibe (from South A division), and Hapoel Abirei Bat Yam (from South B division) were all automatically relegated to Liga Gimel.

The clubs ranked 12th to 15th in each division entered a relegation play-off, at the end of which Maccabi Tamra (from North A division), Hapoel Isfiya (from North B division), Maccabi HaSharon Netanya (from South A division) and Maccabi Sderot (from South B division) dropped to Liga Gimel as well.

North A Division

North B Division

F.C. Bu'eine was dismissed from the league, demoted to Liga Gimel and its results were nullified.

South A Division

South B Division

Promotion play-offs

Northern Divisions

Maccabi Sektzia Ma'alot-Tarshiha qualified to the promotion play-off match against 14th ranked club in Liga Alef North division, Hapoel Daliyat al-Karmel.

Promotion play-off Match

Maccabi Sektzia Ma'alot-Tarshiha Promoted to Liga Alef; Hapoel Daliyat al-Karmel relegated to Liga Bet.

Southern Divisions

Hapoel Hod HaSharon qualified to the promotion play-off match against 14th ranked club in Liga Alef South division, Maccabi Be'er Sheva.

Promotion play-off Match

Relegation/promotion match

Hapoel Hod HaSharon Promoted to Liga Alef; Maccabi Be'er Sheva relegated to Liga Bet. However, they were eventually reprieved from relegation, after Ironi Bat Yam, which have finished 12th in Liga Alef South, folded during the summer.

Relegation play-offs

Northern divisions

North A division

Maccabi Tamra relegated to Liga Gimel

North B division

Hapoel Isfiya relegated to Liga Gimel

Southern divisions

South A division

HaSharon Netanya relegated to Liga Gimel

South B division

Maccabi Sderot relegated to Liga Gimel

References
 The Israel Football Association 
 The Israel Football Association 
 The Israel Football Association 
 The Israel Football Association 

Liga Bet seasons
4
Israel